The Municipal Corporation Buildings, Erode, is the seat of the Erode Municipal Corporation and is situated near Panneer selvam Park, in the middle of Erode city, Tamil Nadu, India.

The building 
Erode Municipal Council came into existence in 1872 and was elevated to Special Grade during the year 1980 and upgraded as a Municipal Corporation with effect from the very first of the year 2008.

Starting from the earlier administration of the City, this building is the place for council that is being elected. It is a four storeyed building near PS Park in normal Indian style architecture.

Later after upgradation into Corporation, the Council is expanding the complex with an additional five-storeyed building, in the place of Museum. The work on constructing additional building is nearing completion, apart from the modernisation of the Old building.

The New Extension of the building will house the Council Hall, Office of the Commissioners, Engineers and it will house the Town Planning officer and health officers.

Corporation Memorial Pillar
The main attraction of the building was the Corporation Memorial Pillar built in front. This was installed by the same Erode Municipal Corporation in memorandum of the upgradation of Erode Municipal Council into a Corporation. The Pillar is a modern architecture with Granite stones of about 50feet high. There is a Clock mounted on all the four sides of the Pillar, like a clock tower. Also, at the top of the pillar, is the four-lion capital, the model of Asoka's Pillars.

References

External links
 View of the Modernised Building with the Memorial Pillar in front
 View of the Old Building
 

Municipal buildings in India
Government buildings in Tamil Nadu
Local government in Tamil Nadu
Erode